Julian Du Plessis (born 13 March 1977 in Cape Town), known by his stage names Snazz D or Snazz the Dictator, is a South African underground rapper and music producer.

Early life
Julian Du Plessis was born in Cape Town, South Africa. He grew up in Gugulethu a South African township on the Cape Flats, before moving to Mitchells Plain another township on the Flats. Inspired by the hip-hop movement and culture developing on the Cape Flats at the height of Apartheid, with groups such as Prophets of Da City and Black Noise emerging, he began rhyming as a young teenager in the early nineties under the moniker Snazzy D. In 1993 he relocated to Johannesburg, where his reputation grew. His first group was called Dark Seed together with rapper Fee and producer Iko. Their first single "Mic Device" was featured on "The Muthaload: A Cube Collective" released on Tusk Music in 1996; The first hip-hop compilation album to be released in South Africa. The record also featured debut songs by Amu, Metamo Forces, Ramesh, Shorty & Loko. The group Dark Seed disbanded shortly thereafter.

Career

1996–1999: Audio Visual, GroundWorks & Cashless Society
In 1996, Snazz formed the now cult-crew Audio Visual, together with Krook'd tha Warmonger (Isaac Chokwe) and Ben Sharpa (Kgotso Semela). He became the host MC at the now legendary Saturday matinee sessions at 'Le Club' downtown Johannesburg with DJ Blaze and DJ Bionic. In 1998 he co-founded the group Cashless Society, together with Draztik (Dave Balsher), Fat Free (Salim Mosidinyane), Black Intellect (Jerry Kai Lewis), X-Amount (Kwezi Ngcakani), Criminal (Alfred Chirwa), Tizeye (Tyrone Phillips) & Gemini (Thabiso Mofokeng). The group boasted members from South Africa, Botswana, Sierra Leone and Malawi all based out of Johannesburg and Gaborone, Botswana at the time forming their own Independent 'Unreleased Records' imprint.

2000–2001: Work in Germany & Fondle 'Em Records
In 1999, Snazz travelled to Cologne, Germany where he worked with the likes of Metaphysics, Laygwan Sharkie, Remarkable and Clueso, making guest appearances on various recordings including the debut album of Clueso "Text und Ton" on Four Music during his three-month visit.

The following year Bobbito Garcia, Mr. Len and Jean Grae traveled to South Africa from New York to perform in South Africa for the first time. Bobbito then released the split-12" single of Cashless Society "Blaze tha Breaks" b/w Mizchif "Place For A Wife" on his own Independent Fondle 'Em Records in 2000 upon their return to the States. The single was released in Southern Africa on Unreleased Records the following year, and it was also featured on the "Farewell Fondle 'Em" compilation released on Definitive Jux as well.

2002–2006: Demolition and African Raw Material
In 2002 GroundWorks released their debut album "Demolition: The MeStory" on Concentration Camp Records with Snazz self-produced 'Copaesthetic Phenomenology'. GroundWorks were a collective of artists from the Johannesburg and Cape Town scenes including members of Audio Visual, Cashless Society and BaseMental Platform. Members of the group include Ben Sharpa, Krook'd tha Warmonga, Forekast, Gemini, Hueman, Non-Depiction, Bonafide, and S.E.L.F. The next year Concentration Camp Records released the compilation album "Pavement Special Volume 1" which featured songs 'Show Me Yours' and 'The Epitaph' by Audio Visual as well as his solo song 'The Work'.

In 2003 Cashless Society released their debut album "African Raw Material volume one" on Unreleased Records. The album featured hit singles 'Hottentot Hop (Bantu 1, 2)' and 'Taxi Wars' with guest appearances by Tumi, Mizchif and Masauko of Blk Sonshine. Distribution was handled by BMG Africa with the album earning three SAMA awards for best hip-hop album, best single and best music video, while winning four awards at the South African "Hiphop Indaba Awards" as well. The third single off of the album '8-3-1 (I Love You)', a dedication to Johannesburg, was featured on the Soundtrack of "Yizo Yizo 3". The group was then photographed for the cover of the first issue of HYPE magazine, the first national hip-hop publication in South Africa.

In 2005 he appeared on the "Imbizo Street Mixtapes Vol. 1" on Unreleased Records with the single '2 Sides to every story' which featured Kilani Rich. The song was later featured on HYPE magazine's "Hype Sessions Vol. 15: Story Time " mixed by DJ Raiko. He also starred in the first hip-hop commercial for CNN Inside Africa together with rapper Young Nations. The following year saw the single 'Best of both Worlds' a collaboration with Sub Z featured on the "Drudge Dialect Vol. 1" compilation album which was released on Pioneer Unit Records. The song would later be featured on DJ Sarasa's "KWANZAA!" Mix-CD released on DJ Honda Recordings in Japan.

2007–2009: Dangerous and Emcee Africa
In 2007, he released the "Dangerous Mix-CD" on FIRE-Ent. which featured the Ca$hless Family, the extended family of the group Cashless Society. The CD featured the single "Stick-U" which saw Snazz rapping in a mix of English and Tsotsitaal, a South African street language with elements of different Southern African languages. That same year he participated in the Channel O Sprite Emcee Africa competition. A continental freestyle battle competition which included challenges in Angola, Ghana, Kenya, Nigeria and Tanzania. Snazz won the South African leg of the battle defeating Adamiz in the final, then making it to the final of the continental battle where he beat Ghanaian rapper J-Town, earning him $10,000,- in prize money, and a track with Wordsworth, one of the judges in the competition.

He also featured on the 'Battle Chronicles (Emcee Africa)' single and video alongside DJ Black, Rage, Yung D, J-Town, Modenine, Professor Jay and Nazizi which served to promote the competition, bringing together performers from the different countries that were hosting the competition.

2010–2012: Bad For Business and Street Dictatorship
In 2010 Snazz released his solo debut album together with producer Albert Iron titled "Bad For Business" on the Independent Afrocentric Artz label published by African Dope Publishing. The album featured appearances by Zubz, Point Blank and Samela and featured the single 'Spellbound'. He followed up his album with the release of "Street Dictatorship Vol. 1" and "Street Dictatorship Vol. 2" together with producer Master Hu on his own Independent Dictatio Records. In 2012 he participated in the freestyle battle series "SCRAMBLES4MONEY - Talk Is Cheap" in Johannesburg where he lost to Fungus the Mutated Lung in the opening round of the competition.

Personal life
Snazz is a Cape coloured, an ethnic group composed primarily of people of mixed race. He is the father of one daughter and a son.

Discography

Solo career
Albums
 Bad For Business - Snazz D and Albert Iron. Afrocentric Artz (AFROCD001-3668) (2010)
 "Coup De Tat" - Snazz Tha Dictator. Play N Pay Records (2017)

Singles
 Time Will Reveal - Snazz D featuring Wordsworth, Octave Couplet (2008)
 You Know The Name - Snazz D, Iapetus Records (2012)

Mixtapes
 Street Dictatorship Vol. 1 - Snazz D. Dictatio Records (2013)
 Street Dictatorship Vol. 2 - Snazz D and Master Hu. Dictatio Records (2014)

Collaborations
With GroundWorks
 Demolition: The MeStory - GroundWorks, Concentration Camp (CC001) (2002)

With Cashless Society
 The World Iz A Ghetto - The Hard Cashless Society, Unreleased Records (MCUR 001) (2000)
 Blaze Tha Breaks - Cashless Society b/w "Place For A Wife" - Mizchif, Fondle 'Em Records (FE-SA1) (2000)
 Blaze Tha Breaks - Cashless Society, Unreleased Records (CDUR 001) (2001)
 African Raw Material volume one - Cashless Society, Unreleased Records (CDUR 1000) (2003)

With The Ca$hless Family
 Dangerous! The Mix-CD - Snazz-D & The Ca$hless Family, FIRE-Ent. (2007)

Guest appearances
 "Grid Locked" (featuring Remark, Clueso & Snazz) by DJ Chestnut on Doo My Thing... - DJ Redoo, 10vor10 (2000)
 "What You Wanna Doo?" by Clueso, Metaphysics, Wasu & Snazz on Doo My Thing... - DJ Redoo, 10vor10 (2000)
 "Grid Locked" (featuring Snaz & Remarkable) on Text und Ton - Clueso, Four Music (FOR 503052) (2001)
 "Well" (featuring Snazz the Dictator) on Error Era - Tha Hymphatic Thabs, Taste Buds (BUDS001) (2001)
 "Cry For My Beloved" by DJ Bionic, Snazz & Blaze on Heal The Hood Vol. 3 - Various Artists, Cape Flats Uprising (2003)
 "The Work" by Snazz tha Dictator on Pavement Special Vol.1 - Various Artists, Concentration Camp (CC002) (2003)
 "Posse Cut" (featuring Snazz D & Gemini) on Attention to Detail - Fifth Floor, Seamless (SEAMCD01) (2004)
 "Khumbul'ekhaya" (featuring Snazz D) on Peace Of Mind - MXO, Epic (CDEPC 8296) (2004)
 "Get Rowdy" (featuring Snazz D) on Writers Club - Zubz, Outrageous Records (2005)
 "2 Sides to every story" by Snazz D & Kilani Rich on Imbizo Street Mixtapes Vol. 1 - Various Artists, Unreleased Records (CDURIDBE 1000) (2005)
 "Grid Locked" by SubzZ, Clueso & Snazz D on Perigo Minas Volume One - Various Artists, Landmynz Entertainment (2006)
 "Pump Action" by Snazz D on Perigo Minas Volume One - Various Artists, Landmynz Entertainment (2006)
 "Best of Both Worlds" by Sub Z & Snazz D on Drudge Dialect Vol. 1 - Various Artists, Pioneer Unit Records (2006)
 "Two Sides to every story" by Snazz D & Kilani Rich on Hype Sessions Vol. 15: Story Time - Raiko, HYPE Magazine (2006)
 "On My Own 2" by Snazz D on Nokia Hype Sessions Vol. 9 - Various Artists, HYPE Magazine (2006)
 "Supa-Tite" (featuring Snazz D) on Gutter Butter Vol. 1 - Qba, getBread Entertainment (2007)
 "I Know" by Snazz D on The Street Cred Compilation Vol. 1 - Various Artists, Liber8 Records (2008)
 "Battle Chronicles (Emcee Africa)" by DJ Black, Rage, Yung D, J-Town, Mode 9, Snazz, Professor J & Nazizi on Hype Sessions Vol. 21: Jazzworx FM The Album - Various Artists, HYPE Magazine (2008)
 "Best of Both Worlds" by Sub Z & Snazz D on KWANZAA! - DJ Sarasa a.k.a. Silverboombox, DJ Honda Recordings (SRS-002) (2011)
 "The Reunion" (featuring Infadizle, Ramesh, Biance, Menzi Wamanzi, Jay-Stash, Towdeemac, Spijo, Mr. Selwyn, Snazz D, N. Dubble, Hilton Tebzangwana, JR, Litha, Mizchif, Omen the Chef, Hoodlum, Ms. Supa, Prof Sobukwe & Amu) on Abomrapper 2 - Fortune, Leboda Media (2015)

With Dark Seed
 "Mic Device" by Dark Seed on The Muthaload: A Cube Collective - Various Artists, Tusk Music (WOND143) (1996)

With Audio Visual
 "Not Sayin'" by Audio Visual on Maximum Sentence Vol. 1 - Built On Steel Bars - Various Artists, Outrageous Records (OUT (WA) 004) (2003)
 "Show Me Yours" by Audio Visual on Pavement Special Vol.1 - Various Artists, Concentration Camp (CC002) (2003)
 "The Epitaph" by Audio Visual on Pavement Special Vol.1 - Various Artists, Concentration Camp (CC002) (2003)

With GroundWorks
 "Dungeon Keepers" by GroundWorks on Heal The Hood Vol. 3 - Various Artists, Cape Flats Uprising (2003)

With Cashless Society
 "Blaze Tha Breaks" by Cashless Society on Sweet Sixteen: Vol. 16 - DJ MK, MK Enterprizes (MK-16) (2000)
 "Blaze Tha Breaks" (featuring Snazz D, Black Intellect & X-Amount) by Cashless Society on Farewell Fondle 'Em - V.A., Definitive Jux (DJX-19) (2001)
 "Hottentot Hop (Bantu 1, 2)" by Cashless Society on Silvertab Harambe Dope Sessions - Various Artists, DIY Records (2003)
 "Hottentot Hop (Bantu 1, 2)" by Cashless Society on Rhyme 'N Reason - Various Artists, Ready Rolled Records (RRRCD 009) (2004)
 "8-3-1 (I Love You)" by Cashless Society on Yizo Yizo 3 - Various Artists, CCP Record Company (CDYIZO (WL) 3) (2004)
 "Dolly Partin'" by Cashless Society on Smirnoff Spin Hype Sessions Vol. 1 - Various Artists, HYPE Magazine (2005)
 "Taxi Wars" by Cashless Society on Afrolution Vol. 1 - The Original African Hip Hop Collection - Various Artists, Afrolution Records (afrolution001) (2005)
 "Hottentot Hop (Bantu 1, 2)" by Cashless Society on African Grooves Volume 13 - Various Artists, Blue Pie (2008)
 "Blaze Tha Breaks" by Cashless Society on Life's A 50/50 (Deadly Darts) - DJ Mond & DJ Blueberry, Astro Records (ASTR-0001) (2010)

References

External links
Snazz da Dictator on SoundCloud

Hip hop record producers
South African hip hop musicians
South African rappers
1977 births
Living people
Cape Coloureds
Musicians from Cape Town